Raymond Lawrence "Boots" Riley (born April 1, 1971), is an American film director, producer, screenwriter, rapper, and communist activist. He is the lead vocalist of The Coup and Street Sweeper Social Club. He made his feature-film directorial debut with Sorry to Bother You (released July 2018), which he also wrote.

Early life
Riley was born in 1971 in Chicago into a family of social justice organizers. He is the son of Walter Riley, an African-American attorney, and Anitra Patterson, whose father was African-American, while her mother (Boots' maternal grandmother) was a Jewish refugee from Königsberg who fled Europe with her parents as a teenager in 1938. He is the second youngest of five siblings.

By the time Boots was one, his family had moved to Detroit and when he was six they moved to Oakland, where he later attended Oakland High School.  When the school faced cutbacks in the 1980s, 2000 of Oakland High's 2200 students protested by participating in a walkout organized by Riley and friends.  Interested in politics at a young age, Riley joined the International Committee Against Racism at age 14 and the radical Progressive Labor Party at age 15.

Career

Music

The Coup 

In 1991, Riley founded the political hip hop group The Coup with E-roc. Alongside rappers Spice 1 and Mopreme Shakur (then known as Mocedes), they released a song on a 1991 compilation album called Dope Like a Pound or a Key, released by Wax That Azz Records. Group DJ Pam the Funkstress joined the following year. Riley was both chief lyric writer and music producer of The Coup's albums.

In 1992, The Coup signed to Wild Pitch Records/EMI, and released their debut album Kill My Landlord in 1993. Two of the album's singles, "Dig It" and "Not Yet Free" received play on national Black radio, BET and Yo! MTV Raps.

In 1993, E-40 released the video for "Practice Lookin' Hard", a song based around Riley's lyric, "I got a mirror in my pocket and I practice lookin' hard", from the song "Not Yet Free". The video featured Riley singing the chorus while he, E-40 and Tupac Shakur reflected light into the camera from a handheld mirror while dancing around.

In 1994, The Coup released their second album, Genocide & Juice, featuring guest appearances by E-40 and Spice 1. Fueled by video play and some radioplay for the single "Fat Cats and Bigga Fish", the album shot up the charts, but stalled when EMI absorbed Wild Pitch. At this point, E-roc left The Coup on amicable terms.

1998's Steal This Album, released on indie label Dogday Records, was called "a masterpiece of slow-rolling West Coast funk" by Rolling Stone magazine. The single, "Me and Jesus the Pimp in a '79 Granada Last Night", was an eight-minute song about the grown-up son of a prostitute driving his mother's killer to a secluded place in which to murder him. A novel, Too Beautiful for Words by Monique W. Morris, based on the story characters and descriptions in the song, was published by HarperCollins in 2000. Del the Funky Homosapien guests on the track "The Repo Man Sings for You".
 
The group's fourth album, Party Music, was released on 75 Ark Records in 2001. It was re-released in 2005 by Epitaph Records. The original cover art depicted group members standing in front of the Twin Towers of the World Trade Center as they explode. Riley is depicted pushing a button on a bass guitar tuner and DJ Pam the Funkstress is shown holding conductor's wands. The photo was taken in May 2001, withb5he album was scheduled to be released just after the September 11, 2001 attacks. In response to the uncanny similarity of the artwork with the attacks, th release was delayed until an alternative cover could be prepared. The album hit No. 8 in the 2001 Village Voice Pazz and Jop Poll- the most important year-end critics' list, was named "Pop Album of the Year" by The Washington Post, and "Hip-Hop Album of rge Year" by Rolling Stone. The album included a guest appearance by dead prez on the song "Get Up".

Riley released a controversial press release on September 18, 2001, later published in the book, Another World Is Possible. The press release stated that "last week's events were symptomatic of a larger backlash against U.S. corporate imperialism". The controversy surrounding the cover art, press release and the lyrics from Party Music (specifically the song "5 Million Ways to Kill a CEO") led to Riley appearing on local network news affiliates all over the U.S. He appeared on Fox News's Hannity and Colmes and ABC's Politically Incorrect with Bill Maher. During this time, conservative commentator Michelle Malkin called Riley's lyrics "a stomach-turning example of anti-Americanism disguised as highbrow intellectual expression". The Independent concluded it was "protest album of the year, by a million-man march".

In 2006, The Coup released Pick a Bigger Weapon on Epitaph Records, featuring guest appearances by Tom Morello, Talib Kweli, Black Thought from The Roots, and Jello Biafra.

Work with Tom Morello 
In 2003, guitarist Tom Morello invited Riley to be part of the "Tell Us the Truth Tour", which was meant to shed light on the monopolization of the media and the coming FTAA agreements. The tour, hosted by Janeane Garofalo and Naomi Klein, featured acoustic performances by Riley, Morello, Billy Bragg, Steve Earle, Mike Mills, and Jill Sobule.

In 2006, Morello approached Riley to form a band together under the name Street Sweeper. The duo, who later changed their name to Street Sweeper Social Club, releasing their self-titled debut album in 2009. They toured in support of it along with Nine Inch Nails and Jane's Addiction. On May 24, a press release went out announcing Street Sweeper Social Club as one of the headliners of the 2010 Rock the Bells tour. Street Sweeper Social Club released The Ghetto Blaster EP in late July 2010.

Independent work 
In 1991, the same year Riley co-founded The Coup, he and other activists and hip hop artists created the Mau Mau Rhythm Collective. The Collective put on "Hip-Hop Edutainment Concerts", which allied with and promoted the campaigns of community-based organizations like Women's Economic Agenda Project (WEAP), Copwatch, International Campaign To Free Geronimo Pratt, the Black Panther Alumni Association, and various anti-police brutality projects. The Collective would use the growing popularity of their concerts to bring a large number of youth to take over a closed Oakland city council meeting and hold a public meeting.

In 2005, Riley produced the score for an episode of The Simpsons entitled "Pranksta Rap".

In 2007 and 2008, Riley toured heavily with New Orleans-based band Galactic. The band performed The Coup songs behind Riley's vocals and they also performed their collaboration, "Hustle Up". In 2008, while performing with Galactic, police interrupted the concert and Riley was charged with using "abusive language"—a charge that had not been laid in 26 years, and never before against a performer.

In 2010 and 2011, Riley recorded with Ursus Minor on the album I Will Not Take "But" for an Answer, and toured with the group in France.

Film and television
Riley began working on a screenplay for "an absurdist dark comedy with aspects of magical realism and science fiction', inspired by his own time working as a telemarketer, which he finished in 2012. In 2017, he was able to begin production on his screenplay for Sorry to Bother You, directing it himself, with stars Lakeith Stanfield, Tessa Thompson and Steven Yeun. The film premiered at the Sundance Film Festival on January 20, 2018, and was theatrically released in the United States on July 6, 2018, by Annapurna Pictures. The film received acclaim for its cast and concept, as well as Riley's screenplay and direction.

In June 2020, he announced plans for a new seven-episode series entitled I'm a Virgo, starring Jharrel Jerome. The show will premiere on SXSW on March 11, 2023, then released on Amazon Prime Video later in the year.

In 2021, Riley signed a deal with Media Res.

Activism 
Riley identifies as a communist.

When E-Roc left The Coup in 1994, Riley decided to stop making music in favor of forming an organization called The Young Comrades, with a few other radical, black community organizers including journalist and activist JR Valrey. The organization mounted a few important campaigns in Oakland which yielded some minor victories, such as the campaign against Oakland's "no cruising" ordinance.

In 2000, Riley, through his workshop on Art and Organizing at La Peña Cultural Center, led a group of young artists to create "Guerilla Hip-Hop Concerts" on a flatbed truck which traveled throughout Oakland to protest California's Proposition 21. The workshop also distributed tens of thousands free cassettes of "The Rumble", which he called "newspapers on tape.

In 2002, Riley taught a daily high school class, "Culture and Resistance: Persuasive Lyric Writing", at the School of Social Justice and Community Development in East Oakland.

During the fall of 2011, Riley became heavily involved with the Occupy Oakland movement. In 2018, he spoke at the Socialism 2018 conference.

At the 34th Independent Spirit Awards in 2019, Riley criticized U.S. involvement in the 2019 Venezuelan presidential crisis during his acceptance speech for the Best First Feature award for Sorry To Bother You. His speech, which was cut short, was delivered to the press.

In February 2020, Boots announced his support for Vermont Senator Bernie Sanders in the 2020 United States presidential election.

Discography

Group artist

The Coup
 Kill My Landlord (1993)
 Genocide & Juice (1994)
 Steal This Album (1998)
 Party Music (2001)
 Pick a Bigger Weapon (2006)
 Sorry to Bother You (2012)
 Original Soundtrack: Sorry To Bother You (2018)

Street Sweeper Social Club
 Street Sweeper Social Club (2009)

Solo guest appearances
1991 – Dope Like a Pound or a Key (Compilation)
1994 – "Streets of Oakland" from The Big Badass by Ant Banks
2004 – Zugzwang by Ursus Minor
2007 – "Hustle Up" from From the Corner to the Block by Galactic
2009 – "Soledad" from Este Mundo by Rupa & the April Fishes
2011 – "M M M", "Get On With It" from I Will Not Take "But" for an Answer by Ursus Minor
2011 – "9/11 'til Infinity" from From the Dumpster to the Grave by Star Fucking Hipsters
2011 – "Black Flags" (Single) by Atari Teenage Riot
2014 – "Pocket Full of Slave owners" (Single) by Muja Messiah
2014 – "Black Is Beltza" (Single) by Fermin Muguruza

Filmography

References

External links

Street Sweeper Social Club Website 

1971 births
Living people
American communists
American Marxists
American rappers
American film directors
Rap rock musicians
American hip hop record producers
African-American rappers
African-American rock singers
African-American record producers
African-American film directors
Jewish rappers
Jewish American musicians
African-American Jews
Rappers from Chicago
Rappers from Detroit
Rappers from Oakland, California
West Coast hip hop musicians
American people of German-Jewish descent
21st-century American rappers
Record producers from Illinois
Record producers from California
African-American communists
Jewish communists
Jewish anti-fascists